The Marine Mammal Stranding Center (established in 1978) is a private non-profit organization located in Brigantine, New Jersey. The Stranding Center's main goal is to rescue, rehabilitate, and release stranded marine mammals and sea turtles. They are the only marine stranding center in New Jersey. Since 1978, the Marine Mammal Stranding Center has rescued more than 5,589 whales, dolphins, seals, and sea turtles. Although rehabilitation is costly, over 90% of the animals rehabilitated at the Marine Mammal Stranding Center make a full recovery and are returned to the wild. As well as dealing with marine animal issues, the Marine Mammal Stranding Center operates a Sea Life Museum, houses an educational facility which includes hands-on exhibits, and offers marine ecology-based educational programs.  The Stranding Center also offers internship programs.

References

External links 
 Marine Mammal Stranding Center

Organizations established in 1978
Environmental organizations based in New Jersey
Animal charities based in the United States
Brigantine, New Jersey
Museums in Atlantic County, New Jersey
Natural history museums in New Jersey
Marine mammal rehabilitation and conservation centers
Charities based in New Jersey
1978 establishments in New Jersey